Eupithecia bolespora is a moth in the  family Geometridae. It is found on the Comoros.

References

Moths described in 1937
bolespora
Moths of Africa